New York City Football Club is an American professional soccer club based in New York City that competes in Major League Soccer (MLS), the highest level of American soccer, as a member of the league's Eastern Conference. The club is co-owned by City Football Group, which also owns the English soccer club Manchester City, and Yankee Global Enterprises, owners of the New York Yankees.

New York City played its first league game in the 2015 MLS season, as the twentieth expansion team of the league; it is the first franchise based in the city, and the second in the New York metropolitan area, after the New York Red Bulls, with whom they contest the Hudson River Derby. Since 2015, the club have primarily played their home games at Yankee Stadium (shared with baseball's New York Yankees) in the Bronx; several alternative venues have been used when Yankee Stadium is unavailable, such as Citi Field in Queens, and Red Bull Arena in Harrison, New Jersey.

Jason Kreis was the club's first coach, before being replaced by Patrick Vieira, who guided New York City to their first MLS Cup playoff appearance and second-place finishes in the MLS Supporters' Shield standings. After five years of performing well in the regular season but falling short in the playoffs, Norwegian coach Ronny Deila won the club's first trophy, the 2021 MLS Cup. The club then won its first international trophy when they defeated Atlas at the 2022 Campeones Cup, becoming the first New York-based club to win an international trophy.

Based on attendance from the 2019 regular season, New York City was the ninth best supported club in the league, and the seventh most valuable, worth over $385 million.

History

Foundation
In early 2006, Major League Soccer had an interest in placing a second team in the New York City area. This followed the expiry of MetroStars' exclusive territorial rights as a condition of the club's sale to Red Bull GmbH and the creation of New York Red Bulls. By 2007, the league had held talks with several groups, including New York Mets owner Fred Wilpon and his family, about owning the second New York franchise. The Wilpons' interest in MLS reportedly faded following the family's losses in the Madoff investment scandal, but the league continued to look for investors.

In 2010, MLS commissioner Don Garber officially announced the league's intent to make its 20th franchise a second team in the New York area. At that point, the league hoped to have the new team beginning operations by 2013. Garber also held discussions with the owners of the rebooted New York Cosmos, but they balked at the league's expansion fee and single-entity structure and decided not to apply for entry, instead joining the second-tier North American Soccer League.

Garber had previously cultivated an interest in acquiring investment from a major European soccer club to be owners of a future franchise, and in December 2008, he announced a bid for a Miami expansion team led by FC Barcelona. The team was to begin play in 2010 if accepted, however, the bid eventually fell through. Garber also briefly discussed Barcelona investing in a New York franchise, before moving the focus to Miami.

In 2012, Ferran Soriano, Barcelona's vice president at the time of the Miami bid, was appointed Manchester City CEO, prompting Garber to reach out to him about a New York City team. In December 2012, unnamed sources told the media that Manchester City were close to being announced as the new owners of the 20th team of MLS, and the brand name "New York City Football Club" was trademarked, although the club quickly denied the report. However, Garber announced in March 2013 that he was almost ready to unveil the new expansion team.

Manchester City, in association with the New York Yankees baseball team, paid the $100 million expansion fee to join the league. New York City Football Club, LLC was also registered with the New York State Department on May 7, 2013, and on May 21, the team was officially announced as the 20th Major League Soccer franchise.

On May 22, 2013, the club named former United States and Manchester City midfielder Claudio Reyna as its , responsible for coaching staff and player recruitment ahead of the team's inaugural MLS season in 2015. Reyna, a New Jersey native, also played for the nearby New York Red Bulls. He said he had begun identifying candidates to be the club's head coach, but would not name one in 2013. The team announced an English-language radio deal with WFAN on October 3, 2013.

The club made their first recruitment dealing in off-field matters on September 6, 2013, when they hired former Rutgers University Athletic Director Tim Pernetti to serve as Chief Business Officer, part of a five-year deal with the university. Further hirings were made in mid-November, when three experienced administrators were appointed to vice president roles.

On December 11, 2013, Jason Kreis was announced as the first head coach of the new franchise, having reached the end of his contract at Real Salt Lake and declined an extension. The move came just four days after he missed out on lifting his second MLS Cup with the Utah team, losing on penalties to Sporting Kansas City. It was revealed in the announcement that his contract, starting on January 1, 2014, would see him begin by traveling to Manchester, England, to familiarize himself with the set-up of the franchise owners. Kreis' official unveiling was made at a press conference on January 10, 2014, where he made it public that his former assistant Miles Joseph had joined him at the club.

On June 2, 2014, the club announced that Spanish World Cup-winning striker David Villa had signed as the first ever player. While the team awaited its MLS start in 2015, Villa was loaned to Melbourne City, a club also owned by City Football Group. He was, however, called back after only four matches. On July 24, 2014, New York City announced at a live press conference in Brooklyn that ex-England international and Chelsea all-time top goal scorer Frank Lampard would be joining them as their second Designated Player. Reyna hailed Lampard as "one of the greatest players in world history", while Lampard stated "it is a privilege to be able to help make history here in New York City". On July 6, 2015, the club signed ex-Italian international Andrea Pirlo from Juventus as their third Designated Player.

In the 2015 MLS SuperDraft, as an expansion team, New York City had the second overall pick, choosing Oregon State forward Khiry Shelton as their first pick.

2015–2020: Inaugural season and initial MLS Playoffs failure

An up-and-down pre-season saw them dominate their first ever exhibition match, played against Scotland's St Mirren, with Villa scoring the club's first ever goal in a regulated match, while in the Carolina Challenge Cup, they finished second out of four teams after a slow start ruled out their chances of picking up the non-competitive silverware. Their first ever league game was played on March 8 against fellow expansion side Orlando City, with Mix Diskerud scoring their first ever competitive goal in a game which finished 1–1 in front of a packed Citrus Bowl stadium. A week later in their first home game, Villa and Patrick Mullins scored in their first home win against New England Revolution in front of a crowd of 43,507. The team eventually suffered an eleven-game winless streak which ended on June 16, after defeating the Philadelphia Union 2–1.

New York City faced the New York Cosmos in the fourth round of the 2015 Lamar Hunt U.S. Open Cup, and were eliminated on penalties after playing overtime. The team finished 8th in the Eastern Conference, 17th overall. After the season ended, Kreis was relieved from his head coaching duties on November 2. The team's failure to make the playoffs and the team's second lowest points in the league, were the main factors in his release. A week later, Patrick Vieira was announced as the new head coach of the team.

Under Vieira's stewardship, the club had a remarkable season in 2016. The club began pre-season trading for Jack Harrison, the first overall pick in the 2016 MLS SuperDraft. Harrison made an immediate impact and became a core component of the club in his first year with the team, forming a formidable partnership with Villa. Villa also regained his striking form, eventually becoming the recipient of the league's MVP Award after scoring 23 goals. New York City qualified for the playoffs for the first time in franchise history, eventually losing to Toronto in a two-game series in the Eastern Conference semi-finals. Following the season's conclusion, the club parted ways with Lampard, who had become injury prone during his time with the club. 2017 saw a similar season, with the club replacing Lampard with the arrival of Argentine midfielder Maximiliano Moralez as their new, third Designated Player, while Alexander Ring joined from Kaiserslautern, the pair soon becoming stalwarts in midfield. The club, however, became runners-up for the 2017 Supporters' Shield, finishing the regular season with a record of 16–9–9, as well as a record points total of 57. The club again, however, were once again eliminated from the playoffs in the conference semi-finals, losing to the fifth seeded Columbus Crew by a 4–3 goal aggregate.

New York City had then utilized the following off-season in order to undertake an aggressive overhaul of the squad, with ten senior players departing, including perceived starters Mikey Lopez, R. J. Allen, Frédéric Brillant, and Ethan White. Designated Player Andrea Pirlo also departed, announcing his retirement prior to the club's final playoff game against Columbus Crew. He was then replaced with the addition of Paraguayan international Jesus Medina on New Year's Eve, as New York City's third Designated Player. The club further began upon replacing other departing players with the promotions of both Jonathan Lewis, the third-overall pick in the 2017 MLS SuperDraft, and James Sands, the club's first ever Homegrown Player. Sands also grew up in the nearby city of Rye, New York. Soon after, 2016's Defensive Player of the Year, Rónald Matarrita, extended his contract to remain with the club beyond the 2018 season. The club then made its first acquisition on December 13, with the signing of defender Anton Tinnerholm, who joined from Allsvenskan champions Malmö. Tinnerholm, a Swedish international, is typically deployed as a right-back. The team then acquired another right-back in the form of Saad Abdul-Salaam in a trade with Sporting Kansas City, trading former second overall pick Khiry Shelton, largely considered a bust, on December 14. The club then rounded out the roster with a trio of internationals, as striker Jo Inge Berget, central defender Cédric Hountondji, and speedster Ismael Tajouri-Shradi all joined the team. Brad Stuver was also acquired in a trade with Columbus, in order to provide cover as third-choice goalkeeper. Finally, Ghanaian international Ebenezer Ofori joined on loan from Bundesliga side VfB Stuttgart, while the club selected goalkeeper Jeff Caldwell with the nineteenth overall pick in the 2018 MLS SuperDraft, as they began the season in search of a MLS Cup. The team also conducted business through the season, as they signed Sebastien Ibeagha, a defender who last played for affiliate club San Antonio, after he impressed following a trial.

Midway through the season, however, Vieira would depart the club to return to France, in order to coach at Ligue 1 club Nice. His tenure saw the team adopt a free-flowing, attacking, press-based system, which gained both the team and coach several plaudits from experts, players, and fellow coaches. He departed alongside his band of assistant coaches: Christian Lattanzio, Kristian Wilson and Matt Cook. Vieira was then quickly replaced by Domènec Torrent, Pep Guardiola's long-term assistant coach. Torrent was successful in his first game, securing a 2–1 win at home against Toronto on June 24. The club then added to their roster during the season, with free agent Eloi joining as Torrent's first signing, who arrived from sister club Girona on July 25. The team then concluded a loan deal for youth prospect Valentín Castellanos two days later. Castellanos would score on his debut on August 4. Despite this, Torrent's bright start would eventually fade, and he could only register an additional six victories to close the season, including a period of one win in two months. New York City would eventually qualify for the playoffs as the third seed in the Eastern Conference, but again, were defeated in the second round to conclude the 2018 season. Individually, Moralez shone, and was voted an All-Star for his performances.

The club then underwent another period of transition in the off-season, with several players' options declined on November 29, including cult-hero Tommy McNamara, recent signings Ofori and Eloi, and first team regulars Maxime Chanot and Rodney Wallace. Moreover, Berget's contract with the club was mutually terminated, after just a single season. The club also parted ways with record appearance maker and goalscorer Villa—who had been voted into the MLS Best XI twice and was a four-time MLS All-Star in his four seasons with New York—who joined J-League side Vissel Kobe. Alexander Ring was named the club's second captain after Villa's departure. Later, an option to buy was exercised in Castellanos' loan deal to make his transfer permanent. Chanot was eventually resigned to a multi-year contract on December 8, while Ofori's loan was extended for another season. New York City made their first acquisition, Tony Rocha, just under a week later in a trade with Orlando City, whereby the team parted with a fourth-round pick in the 2019 MLS SuperDraft. The club later loaned in U.S. international Keaton Parks in January, who joined from Portuguese side Benfica, while Juan Pablo Torres joined from Belgian Pro League side Lokeren. Meanwhile, Justin Haak was promoted to the senior team as the club's second Homegrown Player. Hountondji was later waived in order to clear a roster spot for the club's 12th overall draft pick in the 2019 MLS SuperDraft, goalkeeper Luis Barraza. New York City then signed Romanian international Alexandru Mitriță as the club's third Designated Player on February 4, for a rumored club-record transfer fee of US$9.1 million, making him also one of the most expensive transfers in MLS history. The club later signed Brazilian forward Héber on March 21, and in June, signed Scottish forward Gary Mackay-Steven on a free transfer from Aberdeen.

Mid-season, the club traded for defender Eric Miller from Minnesota United on July 29, for $50,000 in general allocation money. Despite these roster changes, the team again failed in the playoffs, falling to previous MLS Cup champions Toronto, despite the club finishing atop the regular season standings in Eastern Conference for the first time. Following this, the club "mutually parted ways" with head coach Torrent. The club announced its end of season awards on November 12, with Chanot receiving Defensive Player of the Year, while Héber won Newcomer of the Year. Moralez again shone in New York for a second successive season, being voted into the 2019 MLS Best XI.

At the start of the off-season, the team oversaw a number of departures; veteran defender Ben Sweat left after being selected by upstart MLS club Inter Miami as their first overall pick in the 2019 MLS Expansion Draft, while Sporting Director Claudio Reyna also left the club, joining expansion side Austin. Reyna was replaced by the in-house promotion of Technical Director David Lee, who assumed the role as Sporting Director. Moreover, the club also announced Homegrown Player Joe Scally would depart to join Bundesliga club Borussia Mönchengladbach, effective January 1, 2021. The official transfer fee was undisclosed, although, multiple reports suggested the fee is to be a seven-figure sum that could rise to become one of the highest transfer fees received for a player in MLS history. Soon thereafter, Parks' loan was made permanent, while the club completed the acquisition of Gedion Zelalem on a free transfer. On January 28, 2020, New York City signed Icelandic midfielder Guðmundur Þórarinsson from Swedish club Norrköping, and the club announced the appointment of Ronny Deila as the new head coach; Deila signed a three-year contract.

New York City began the 2020 season with their debut in the CONCACAF Champions League, and advanced to the quarter finals after defeating Costa Rican outfit San Carlos 6–3 over two legs. The club then began the 2020 MLS season with a defeat, losing 1–0 away against Columbus. New York City subsequently announced the signing of Uruguayan midfielder Nicolás Acevedo from Liverpool Montevideo on March 2, 2020. After the season was suspended due to the COVID-19 pandemic, New York City returned to play in July in the MLS is Back Tournament, where they placed 3rd in Group A, progressing to the quarter finals before falling to eventual champions Portland Timbers 3–1. They finished at the same stage of the CONCACAF Champions League, losing to Mexican side UANL. In the regular season, New York City also failed to see significant success, finishing 5th in the Eastern Conference and losing to Orlando City in the first round of the playoffs.

2021–present: MLS Cup & Campeones Cup winners 

In the subsequent postseason, the club sanctioned the departures of club captain Alexander Ring, leftback Ronald Matarrita, and Gary Mackay-Steven, while former club record transfer Alexandru Mitriță left on loan. The club signed Malte Amundsen in 2021, their first signing of the decade, for a reported fee of $1.6 million, on February 12. The club later completed several additions by June: they drafted Andres Jasson and Vuk Latinovich, signed goalkeeper Cody Mizell, re-signed Zelalem and brought Chris Gloster back to MLS, signed eventual first-team regular Alfredo Morales, and the Brazilian pair Thiago Andrade and Talles Magno; they also loaned Uruguyan midfielder Santiago Rodríguez. Meanwhile, reserve goalkeepers Stuver and Mason Stajduhar departed.

After a start to the season that saw the club slightly struggle while playing multiple home games at Red Bull Arena in New Jersey, the team was sitting in fourth place in the Eastern Conference standings at the end of August after a 2–0 win over the eventual Supporters Shield winners New England Revolution.  The team struggled through September and the beginning of October, winning one game in nine and drawing three others.  This included a draw and two losses to the New York Red Bulls and a five-game stretch where the club did not score a goal. As the pressure began to rise on the squad and manager, Ronny Deila, unlikely hero Guðmundur Þórarinsson broke the club's scoreless streak in the 90th minute of a 1–1 draw against Atlanta. The team went on to win the next three games and scrape a draw with 10 men against Philadelphia in the season finale, clawing their way from being temporarily out of the playoffs in mid-October into fourth place going into the playoffs.  Valentín Castellanos finished the season as the MLS Golden Boot winner with 19 goals and eight assists.

New York City began the playoffs by beating Atlanta United 2–0 at Yankee Stadium, followed by a dramatic win in penalties in Foxboro over Supporters Shield winners New England Revolution in the Eastern Conference semi-finals.  After a 2–2 draw after extra time, NYCFC beat the Revolution 5–3 in penalties after Sean Johnson saved an attempt by Adam Buska.  It was the first penalty shootout win for New York City in five tries and their first MLS Playoffs win on the road.  In the Eastern Conference finals, New York City defeated the Philadelphia Union in a comeback 2–1 win with a late goal in the 88th minute by Talles Magno.  Philadelphia was without the services of 11 players in this match due to MLS COVID-19 Health and Safety protocols, while New York City were without star forward Valentin Castellanos due to a red card in the previous match against New England.

The club went on to face Portland Timbers in their first MLS Cup at Providence Park in Portland.  After Castellanos began the scoring in the 41st minute, New York City were seconds away from their first title before a dramatic 94th-minute equalizer by Portland's Felipe Mora. After a scoreless extra time, Sean Johnson saved two Portland penalties and New York City prevailed 4–2 in the shootout.  Alexander Callens blasted the final penalty into the back of the net for the club's title win. It was the first MLS championship for a team from the New York region and the first title for a New York sports franchise since the New York Giants won Super Bowl XLVI following the 2011 season. Additionally, it was the first top division soccer championship for a New York team since the New York Cosmos won the Soccer Bowl in 1982.

With this victory, the club had earned the right to play in the 2022 Campeones Cup, defeating Mexican side Atlas to win their first international trophy and first New York-based club to do so.

Colors and badge 

With the team announced in 2013, almost two years before it was due to play its first competitive game in 2015, the board of the nascent New York club announced their intention to take their time in building the club, and at the team's launch ceremony did not unveil colors or a badge, instead only using a placeholder image of a blue circle with "New York City FC" written within.

Although club chairman Ferran Soriano emphasized the desire to create a club with its own identity, rather than relying entirely on the brands of club owners Manchester City and the New York Yankees, the online presence that the club kept up across its own website and on various social networking websites maintained a consistent approach of using the sky blue of the Manchester club and the navy blue of the MLB team, along with the white employed by both owner-clubs. With the soccer side running the operations of New York City, however, the vast majority of journalistic reporting and speculation assumed that the club's color-scheme would eventually be revealed as a reflection of, if not a copy of Manchester City's sky blue kits with white trim, with Director of Football Operations Claudio Reyna saying at the press conference announcing his appointment that he was "excited to again wear City's ‘Sky Blue’ as part of the expansion of the MLS".

Having allowed the speculation and amateur designs to build interest in the club for almost nine months, on February 4, 2014, it was announced that the selection of an official club badge was to be forthcoming, with the club planning to release two designs for the crest in two different styles, which would then be put to a public vote to select the chosen design. In the meantime, New York City's official website announced a "Badge of Badges" campaign, inviting all to create their own crests on a hosted badge-designer page, with every entry ultimately to be incorporated into a mosaic of the badge when a final design was selected, the mosaic to be available both online and in physical form at the club's training ground once built.

Although March 3 was originally set as the release date for the two proposed logos, the vote was pushed back as the Yankees vetoed one of the potential crests for infringing their own trademark. The two badge options, both designed by Rafael Esquer following the success of his Made in NY mark, were revealed on March 10.  At that time, the club's official color scheme of navy blue, sky blue and orange was also announced.  The orange was an homage to the city's Dutch heritage, and is the same shade found in the city's flag. Fans were given three days to vote on the final design, and the winner was announced on March 20.

At an event at Hell's Kitchen in Manhattan on November 13, 2014, thousands of fans and media were on hand to see New York City unveil its inaugural jersey. The away jersey was revealed on November 24, a black shirt with sky blue and orange trim and five reflective black stripes to represent the five boroughs of the city.

For the club's second season, a new away uniform was unveiled, featuring shirt, shorts and socks all of navy blue trimmed in orange.  The shirt was dominated by lighter-blue concentric circles radiating out from the logo that "celebrate the energy of New York City". The home uniform remained virtually unchanged, with sky blue socks substituting for the white. On January 7, 2017, the club unveiled its second-ever home uniform, pairing the sky blue shirt with navy blue shorts. A small New York City flag is on the front of the shirt. The club's third away uniform was unveiled on February 7, 2018. The kit is primarily gray with sky blue details, "inspired by the concrete jungle that is the Big Apple".

Kit suppliers and shirt sponsors 

City Football Group sponsor Etihad Airways was announced to be New York City's inaugural jersey sponsor in an event at Terminal 5 on November 13, 2014, at the same event which revealed the club's first ever jersey design. The announcement capped a week in which Heineken and Adidas had also been signed up as secondary sponsors of the club.

Broadcasting 
In one of the club's first announcements on October 3, 2013 – before announcing where the team would play and before any players had been signed – New York City signed an agreement with WFAN to broadcast English-language radio commentary to the New York area for club games and also serves as the flagship station of the 'New York City FC Radio Network', powered by CBS. A year later, on December 18, 2014, the club announced that it was following up its radio deal with an agreement with the YES Network to televise all home and away games. On top of the YES broadcasting rights, the deal included free streaming of all games across the internet via the Fox Sports Go website. With club co-owners the New York Yankees also part-owners of YES, the deals were of little surprise, with even Yankees president Randy Levine openly speculating on the possibility within days of the club's unveiling.

Games were broadcast on radio by WFAN and WNYM during the team's first season; the games were available via webstream for the subsequent two seasons. Broadcasts returned to terrestrial radio in 2018, as noncommercial WNYE became the team's flagship audio outlet. In 2019, Spanish-language radio station WEPN began to broadcast New York City games, with play-by-play from announcer Roberto Abramowitz and color commentary from Ariel Judas.

From 2023, every New York City match is available via MLS Season Pass on the Apple TV app.

Stadium 

On April 21, 2014, the club confirmed that they would play their first season home games at Yankee Stadium, and that plans for a future stadium were in progress.

Before the official team was announced, plans were presented by MLS to build a soccer stadium in Flushing Meadows–Corona Park in Queens. However, due to opposition to building a stadium on park land as well as objections from the New York Mets, who play nearby, the site lost favor once the new team was announced. The team came up with an alternate proposal to build the stadium in the Bronx adjacent to Yankee Stadium. In 2015, New York property lawyer Martin Edelman, a member of Manchester City's board of directors, said that New York City had abandoned plans for the Bronx site. On August 17, 2017, the club's architects attended a site visit of Belmont Park on Long Island held by the Empire State Development Corporation for parties interested in developing land adjacent to the racetrack.

Club president Jon Patricof confirmed in September 2017 that the franchise "(has) multiple sites under active consideration – some involve public processes and some are private." On September 25, 2017, it was reported that the club would submit a proposal to build a soccer-specific stadium on the  site at Belmont Park. On December 19, 2017, the site at Belmont Park was selected by the Empire State Development Corporation for the New York Islanders' new 18,000-seat arena, ending the club's pursuit of a soccer-specific stadium at the site.

On September 23, 2017, New York City played a home match at Pratt & Whitney Stadium at Rentschler Field in East Hartford, Connecticut,  from the city, due to a scheduling conflict with a rescheduled Yankees game.

On October 22, 2017, New York City played their final regular season home match at Queens' Citi Field, home of the New York Mets, due to another scheduling conflict with a Yankees American League Championship Series game at Yankee Stadium.

In April 2018, new plans for the Harlem River Yards development in the south Bronx were revealed, for the land north of the Willis Avenue Bridge; the area would be anchored by the new stadium of 26,000 seats, which would be designed by Rafael Viñoly. On April 25, 2018, it was reported by club president Jon Patricof that the club is focusing on other sites more seriously than Harlem Yards. "We submitted something to the State [of New York] as part of a request for expressions of interest," said Patricof about the Harlem River Yards site. "But that's it. That site is not an active site."

In 2020, they used Red Bull Arena for two matches of the 2020 CONCACAF Champions League due to both Yankee Stadium and Citi Field undergoing unavoidable winterization procedures at the time. The team would also use the arena again between August and September 2020 after scheduling conflicts at Yankee Stadium prevented the team from using the stadium. The club hosted an additional eight home matches at Red Bull Arena for the 2021 MLS Season due to scheduling conflicts at Yankee Stadium.

In 2022, after NYCFC appeared again for the 2022 CONCACAF Champions League, the club later confirmed that neither Yankee Stadium nor Citi Field are approved venues by CONCACAF for the CONCACAF Champions League, meaning that any CCL matches would be required to be played at an CONCACAF approved venue such as Red Bull Arena or at other available CONCACAF approved venue. Both the Round of 16 and Quarterfinals were required to be played outside of the New York City area, with the Round of 16 match played at the Banc of California Stadium in Los Angeles, California due to the close proximity of LA Galaxy's home stadium where they played their first MLS season match, as well as Pratt & Whitney Stadium in East Hartford, Connecticut. The club played at Red Bull Arena in April 2022 for the second leg of the semifinals.

In November 2022, New York City and NYCFC came to an agreement to build a 25,000 seat stadium in Willets Point, Queens that is expected to be completed in 2027.

Culture

Supporters 
New York City's official supporter group, The Third Rail, began to form after the club's announcement in May 2013, when fans met through social media, and through member drives and viewing parties for 2014 FIFA World Cup matches. It had registered 1,600 members before the team's first season. Although the group operates independently from the club, it was recognized as the official supporter group and has received exclusive access to one section in Yankee Stadium. Then-group president Chance Michaels said the name reflected the group's desire to "power NYCFC" the way the third rail powered the New York City Subway system.

Before the club began play in March 2015, the club's season-ticket membership had already surpassed 14,000, and by April 2015 season-ticket sales had reached 16,000. In October of that year, the club announced that it had sold 20,000 season tickets for the inaugural season.

On April 29, 2017, NYCSC (New York City Supporters Club) was recognized as the club's second official supporters group. On February 13, 2020, NYCFC officially parted ways with NYCSC. After two years the club recognized Los Templados #12 as the second official supporters group on February 11, 2022, replacing NYCSC which parted ways with the club in 2020.

Rivalries 

In May 2015, the New York metropolitan area experienced a genuine local derby in MLS league play for the first time, when New York City played their first game against the New York Red Bulls. Although initially regarded as a manufactured rivalry with little of the traditional banter apparent between long-time local rivals, the first meetings between the two clubs displayed an increasing level of animosity between the two sides. The Red Bulls won the first ever encounter between the two, a league game on May 10, 2015, at Red Bull Arena. A series of brawls between supporters of the two teams occurred before and after matches between the two teams. The contest has been dubbed the Hudson River Derby by supporters.

Outside of their traditional rivalry with the Red Bulls, NYCFC has also developed a rivalry with the Philadelphia Union, in line with many other New York-Philadelphia rivalries. Though early fixtures between the two clubs were relatively routine, the rivalry began to develop after New York City controversially eliminated the Union in the 2021 Eastern Conference Final after the latter lost several players due to MLS's COVID-19 protocols. This rivalry further developed when the two sides faced off again in the 2022 Eastern Conference Final in the following season, with the Union winning the rematch.

Social media campaigns 
In 2015, MLS hosted a contest between New York City and New York Red Bulls ahead of the Hudson River Derby on June 28. The team with the most votes would have the Empire State Building lit up in their favor. New York City, with over 1 million Facebook followers, launched the 'WINNYCFC' campaign on the platform and won the contest. In the 2016 MLS season, the club started the 'We Are One' campaign on social media, followed by the 'Support Your City' campaign during the playoffs later that year.

Players and staff

Roster

Out on loan

Current technical staff 
{| class="wikitable"
|-
! style="background:#6CACE4; color:#041E42; border:2px solid #FE5000;" scope="col" colspan="2"|Executive

|-
! style="background:#6CACE4; color:#041E42; border:2px solid #FE5000;" scope="col" colspan="2"|Coaching staff

Executives

Affiliates and club academy 
The USL's Wilmington Hammerheads were New York City's first affiliate club, announced on January 16, 2015. One year later, both clubs announced a long-term extension to that original agreement. On April 21, 2016, the club also announced that the Long Island Rough Riders would be their official Premier Development League partner beginning with the 2016 season. After the Wilmington Hammerheads dropped to an amateur league following the 2016 season, New York City further announced another affiliation agreement, partnering with San Antonio on February 9, 2017. Sporting Director Claudio Reyna called the agreement "an important affiliation for NYCFC with an ambitious, forward-thinking club like San Antonio, which shares our drive to grow the game within their own passionate soccer community."

New York City also began building its youth development program in April 2014 by partnering with eight local youth soccer clubs. This foresaw the club formally announcing the creation of an academy in February 2015, beginning with a single team at U-13 and U-14 level. The academy saw its first success in 2017, with the U-16 team winning the Generation Adidas Cup, becoming the first major silverware earned by New York City in any capacity.

Team records

Year-by-year 

For the full season-by-season history, see List of New York City FC seasons.

1. Avg. attendance include statistics from league matches only.
2. Top goalscorer(s) includes all goals scored in League, MLS Cup Playoffs, U.S. Open Cup, CONCACAF Champions League, MLS is Back Tournament, FIFA Club World Cup, and other competitive continental matches.

International competition
 Scores and results list New York City FC's goal tally first.

Head coaches 
 Includes regular season, playoff, CONCACAF Champions League, U.S. Open Cup and MLS is Back Tournament games.

Captains

Average attendance

Honors
National 
 MLS Cup
 Champions: 2021

 Supporters' Shield
Runners-up: 2017, 2019

 Eastern Conference (Regular Season)
 Title Winners: 2019
Runners-up: 2016, 2017

 Eastern Conference (Playoff)
 Title Winners: 2021
Runners-up: 2022
Continental
 Campeones Cup
 Champions: 2022

See also 

 Manchester City FC
 Melbourne City FC
 Montevideo City Torque
 Mumbai City FC
 Soccer in New York City
 Expansion of Major League Soccer

Notes

References

External links 

 

 
Association football clubs established in 2013
2013 establishments in New York City
Soccer clubs in New York City
Major League Soccer teams
Yankee Global Enterprises